Sand is a Norwegian and German surname. Notable people with the surname include:

Bjørn Sand (born 1928), Norwegian revue writer and actor
Christopher Sand (1644–1680), Polish writer, author of Bibliotheca antitrinitariorum
Duane Sand (born 1965), American politician
Ebbe Sand (born 1972), Danish football player
George Sand (1804–1876), French novelist
Heinie Sand (1897–1958), American baseball player
Ida Sand (born 1977), Swedish jazz singer and pianist
Jon Ola Sand, Eurovision Song Contest executive supervisor
José Sand (born 1980), Argentine football player
Karl Ludwig Sand (1795–1820), German martyr
Lauritz Sand (1879–1956), Norwegian soldier
Leonard B. Sand (born 1928), American judge
Marc Sand (born 1988), Austrian footballer
Maurice Sand (1823–1889), French illustrator and writer
Nancy Sand (born 1964), Argentine politician
Nicholas Sand (born 1941) American drug producer
O. Normann Sand (1921–1974), Norwegian politician
Paul Sand (born 1935), American actor
Paul M. Sand (1914–1984), American judge
Peter Sand (born 1972), Danish football player and manager
Rob Sand (born 1982), American politician
Roxana Sand, American erotic dancer
Shauna Sand (born 1971), American actress
Shlomo Sand (born 1946), Israeli historian
Todd Sand (born 1963), American ice skater
Ulf Oscar Sand (born 1938), Norwegian politician
Vebjørn Sand (born 1966), Norwegian painter

Norwegian-language surnames
German-language surnames